Anes Zverotić (born 1 October 1985) is a Montenegrin retired footballer who played as a striker.

He played 5 matches for FC Wil in the Swiss Super League.

Personal life
He is the nephew of fellow professional footballer Elsad Zverotić.

References

External links
 

1985 births
Living people
Place of birth missing (living people)
Montenegrin emigrants to Switzerland
Association football forwards
Serbia and Montenegro footballers
Montenegrin footballers
FC Wil players
FC Gossau players
FC St. Gallen players
FC Tuggen players
SC Brühl players
Swiss Super League players
Montenegrin expatriate footballers
Expatriate footballers in Austria
Montenegrin expatriate sportspeople in Austria